INO80 complex subunit C is a protein that in humans is encoded by the INO80C gene.

References

Further reading